The Bi-Autogo was a prototype American cyclecar, built from 1908 to 1912.

Designed and built by Detroit artist & engineer James Scripps Booth, it had the usual two wheels (wooden-spoked), plus two pairs of smaller, retractable outrigger wheels in the three-seater body. Just one was built. It is in the collection of the Detroit Historical Society. The Bi-Autogo was restored in 2017 by Mobsteel in Detroit.

See also
 Gyrocar
 Cyclecar
 List of motorcycles of the 1910s
 List of motorcycles by type of engine

References

Cyclecars
Motorcycles of the United States
Defunct motorcycle manufacturers of the United States
Manufacturing companies based in Detroit
Motor vehicle manufacturers based in Michigan
Motorcycles introduced in the 1910s
Vehicles introduced in 1908
Eight-cylinder motorcycles
American companies established in 1908
Vehicle manufacturing companies established in 1908
Vehicle manufacturing companies disestablished in 1912
1908 establishments in Michigan
1912 disestablishments in Michigan
Defunct companies based in Michigan
Scripps family

Brass Era vehicles